Benfica do Ribatejo is a town and a civil parish in the municipality of Almeirim, Portugal. The population in 2011 was 3,067, in an area of 29.27 km².

References

Parishes of Almeirim
Towns in Portugal